Salesa is a surname. Notable people with the surname include: 

Damon Salesa (born 1972), Samoan New Zealand academic
Jenny Salesa (born 1968), New Zealand politician
To’alepaiali’i Toeolesulusulu Salesa III (died 2008), Samoan high chief